Pretoria Secondary School is a public, English-speaking high school in Pretoria, Gauteng, South Africa.

External links
 Pretoria Secondary School Website

Schools in Pretoria
High schools in South Africa